Owen Wyn Owen (1925 – 13 March 2012) was a Welsh automobile restorer and mechanic. He lived in Capel Curig, Snowdonia. His working life was spent as a lecturer in engineering at Caernarfonshire Technical College in Bangor, but he is known for his outside achievements. He died in March 2012.

Restoration of Babs

His most famous restoration project, which received worldwide attention, was to excavate and restore Babs, after 40 years buried on a tidal beach. "Babs" was the car that in 1927, driven by J. G. Parry-Thomas, whilst attempting the land speed record at the time (180 mph or 290 km/h), crashed and killed the driver. The car was buried where the accident occurred on Pendine Sands.

In 1967 Wyn Owen decided to excavate and restore Babs. The car was first successfully tested on The Helyg straight in the early 1970s and was later successfully demonstrated in front of the world press and television on an air field near RAF Valley, Anglesey.

The restoration work took place in Owen's garage in Capel Curig, and "Babs" was displayed in the Pendine Museum of Speed during the summer months until its demolition in 2019. The car will return to display on completion of the new Sands of Speed Museum.

In 1999, Owen was awarded the Tom Pryce trophy, engraved with the words Atgyfodwr Babs.

References

External links

1925 births
2012 deaths
Car restorers
Welsh engineers
Welsh craftspeople
People from Caernarfonshire
British automotive engineers
20th-century British engineers